Buturović Polje (Cyrillic: Бутуровић Поље) is a village in the municipality of Konjic, Bosnia and Herzegovina.

Demographics 
According to the 2013 census, its population was 348.

References

Populated places in Konjic